Alberto Jose Alburquerque (born June 10, 1986) is a Dominican professional baseball pitcher for the Long Island Ducks of the Atlantic League of Professional Baseball. He has played in Major League Baseball (MLB) for the Detroit Tigers, Los Angeles Angels, Kansas City Royals, and Chicago White Sox.

Professional career

Chicago Cubs
Signed by scout Jose Serra, Alburquerque began his professional career in 2006 with the AZL Cubs, in the Chicago Cubs farm system. He went 0–2 with a 5.98 ERA in eight games (five starts) that season. He also had 15 strikeouts in 12 innings. In 2007, he played for the Boise Hawks and Peoria Chiefs, going a combined 4–6 with a 5.83 ERA in 21 games (10 starts). In 66 innings, he struck out 69 batters. He did not play at all in 2008 due to a right shoulder tear.

Alburquerque began the 2009 season in the Cubs system, pitching for the Daytona Cubs.

Colorado Rockies
However, he was traded to the Colorado Rockies partway through the season as a player to be named later in a deal that sent Jeff Baker to the Cubs. He finished the season with the Tulsa Drillers. Overall, he went 2–3 with a 2.80 ERA in 47 relief appearances, striking out 75 batters in 61 innings. He pitched for the Drillers again in 2010, going 2–4 with a 4.98 ERA in 25 relief appearances.

Detroit Tigers
Following the 2010 season, he became a free agent and signed a major league contract with the Detroit Tigers on November 19. The Tigers placed him on the team's 40-man roster despite having never appeared in a Major League game. Alburquerque was assigned to the Triple-A affiliate Toledo Mud Hens following spring training, where he appeared in 4 games, with a 1.93 ERA and 10 strikeouts in 4 innings pitched.

Alburquerque made his major league debut on April 15, 2011, on Jackie Robinson Day wearing the legendary #42 Jersey, against the Oakland Athletics. He struck out the first batter he faced and pitched two scoreless innings with three strikeouts.

On August 12, 2011, Alburquerque was hit in the head by a ball hit by Baltimore Orioles Robert Andino during batting practice. He was taken to the hospital and stayed overnight for tests. The next day, the Tigers placed him on the 7-day disabled list with a concussion. He appeared in 41 games for the Tigers in 2011, going 6–1 with a 1.87 ERA. In 43 innings, he allowed only 21 hits, while striking out 67 batters for an exceptional rate of 13.9 per 9 innings.

Following the 2011 season, it was discovered that Alburquerque had suffered a non-displaced stress fracture in his right (throwing) elbow. He had a screw inserted during surgery performed by Dr. James Andrews, and had an expected recovery time of 6–8 months. On April 24, 2012, he was transferred to the 60-day disabled list, with an earliest possible return date of June 3.

On July 24, 2012, Alburquerque began a rehab assignment with the Lakeland Flying Tigers.  On August 3, the organization moved him to the Toledo Mud Hens, with the expectation that the move meant a return to the Major League club in the near future. He appeared in 13 minor league games in 2012, going 1–0 with a 2.57 ERA and striking out 27 batters in 14 innings. He would eventually make his 2012 debut with the Tigers on September 4 against the Cleveland Indians, pitching 1 scoreless innings and striking out one batter. At the major league level, he made eight appearances during the regular season and posted a 0.68 ERA. He had 18 strikeouts in 13 innings.

Alburquerque was placed on the playoff roster for the 2012 American League Division Series against the Oakland Athletics.  He made his first appearance of the postseason in Game 2 against Yoenis Céspedes in the bottom of the ninth with men on the corners and two out, and the game tied at four runs apiece. He pitched the Tigers out of the inning, inducing a ground ball back to the mound, and left the game as the pitcher of record.  In a moment of levity, he kissed the ball before flipping it softly to Prince Fielder at first to complete the play. Alburquerque earned the win when Don Kelly hit an RBI sacrifice fly to right to win the game in the bottom of the inning. Alburquerque also pitched one scoreless inning of relief in Game 4 of the same series.

Alburquerque threw 49 innings out of the Tiger bullpen in 2013, finishing with a 4.59 ERA. After allowing no home runs in 2011 and 2012, he surrendered five in 2013. In the Tigers 2013 postseason run, he pitched in 4 innings, allowing two earned runs and striking out nine batters.

Alburquerque reached a career-high  innings of relief in 2014, posting a 2.51 ERA while striking out 63 batters. He also had a career-low walk rate of 3.3 per 9 innings.

On January 24, 2015, Alburquerque and the Tigers avoided arbitration agreeing on a one-year, $1.725 million contract. Alburquerque pitched a career-high 62 innings out of the bullpen in 2015, posting a 4–1 record and 4.21 ERA. He shared the major league lead in balks, with four.

On December 2, 2015, the Tigers announced they would not tender a contract to Alburquerque, making him a free agent.

Los Angeles Angels
On January 19, 2016, Alburquerque signed a 1-year, $1.1 million contract with the Los Angeles Angels. On March 29, the Angels optioned Alburquerque to the Triple-A Salt Lake Bees. In two games with the Angels, he appeared in two innings, posting a 4.50 ERA. He was designated for assignment on May 21. He was released on August 13.

Seattle Mariners
The Seattle Mariners signed Alburquerque to a minor league contract on August 23, 2016.

Kansas City Royals
On January 7, 2017, Alburquerque signed a minor league contract with the Kansas City Royals that included an invitation to spring training. The Royals promoted him to the major leagues on May 10. In 11 games with the Royals, he went 0–1 with a 3.60 ERA. He was released on July 29.

Chicago White Sox
On August 4, 2017, the White Sox signed Alburquerque to a minor league deal. In 10 games with the White Sox, he went 0–1 with a 1.13 ERA. He was granted free agency on December 1.

Toronto Blue Jays
On January 18, 2018, Alburquerque signed a minor league deal with the Toronto Blue Jays. He was released on July 2, 2018.

Acereros de Monclova
On February 26, 2019, Alburquerque signed with the Acereros de Monclova of the Mexican League. He made 52 appearances in 2019 for Monclova, posting a 1–1 record and 3.27 ERA with 38 strikeouts in 52.1 innings pitched. Alburquerque did not play in a game in 2020 due to the cancellation of the Mexican League season because of the COVID-19 pandemic. 

In 2021, Alburquerque pitched to a 0–1 record with a 2.78 ERA in 24 relief appearances, striking out 26 in 22.2 innings of work. He was released by the Acereros following the season on August 26, 2021.

Long Island Ducks
On February 16, 2023, Alburquerque signed with the Long Island Ducks of the Atlantic League of Professional Baseball.

Pitching style
Alburquerque is a three-pitch pitcher. He throws a hard four-seam fastball that ranges between 94 and 98 mph, and his "out pitch" is a downward-breaking slider that ranges between 85 and 88 mph. The slider is his most common pitch, especially with two strikes in the count; it has a 60% whiff rate, the fifth-highest for a slider among relief pitchers since the 2007 season.
His best pitch is what scouts call the "Cross Curve" that "breaks this way, and then that way."
His strikeouts per 9 innings pitched ratio is above the league average, sitting at 10.7 through the end of the 2017 season. He also has a high walk rate at 5.0 per 9 innings. Alburquerque was effective in the 2011 season at stranding inherited baserunners, allowing only 3 of 31 to score.

References

External links

1986 births
Acereros de Monclova players
Águilas Cibaeñas players
Arizona League Cubs players
Boise Hawks players
Buffalo Bisons (minor league) players
Charlotte Knights players
Chicago White Sox players
Daytona Cubs players
Detroit Tigers players
Dominican Republic expatriate baseball players in Mexico
Dominican Republic expatriate baseball players in the United States
Estrellas Orientales players
Kansas City Royals players
Lakeland Flying Tigers players

Living people
Los Angeles Angels players
Major League Baseball pitchers
Major League Baseball players from the Dominican Republic
Omaha Storm Chasers players
Sportspeople from San Pedro de Macorís
Peoria Chiefs players
Salt Lake Bees players
Tacoma Rainiers players
Toledo Mud Hens players
Tulsa Drillers players